Nonacosane is a straight-chain hydrocarbon with a molecular formula of C29H60, and the structural formula CH3(CH2)27CH3. It has 1,590,507,121 constitutional isomers.

Nonacosane occurs naturally and has been reported to be a component of a pheromone of Orgyia leucostigma, and evidence suggests it plays a role in the chemical communication of several insects, including the female Anopheles stephensi (a mosquito).

Nonacosane has been identified within several essential oils. It can also be prepared synthetically.

References

Alkanes
Insect pheromones